HMS Chieftain was a  destroyer of the Royal Navy that was in service from March 1946, and which was scrapped in 1961.

Construction
The Royal Navy ordered Chieftain on 24 July 1942, one of eight Ch subclass of the C-class "Intermediate" destroyers of the 1942 Programme. She was laid down at Scotts Shipbuilding and Engineering Company, Greenock, Scotland, on 27 June 1943, and launched 26 February 1945. She was commissioned on 7 March 1946, too late for World War II duty.

Service
Chieftain was assigned to the 1st Destroyer Squadron based at Malta and served with the Royal Navy's 1945-8 Palestine Patrol, intercepting illegal immigration into Mandate Palestine. In 1947 Chieftain intercepted three immigrant ships: a schooner, a former USCG cutter, and a former USN vessel. The ex-cutter Unalga renamed Chaim Arlosoroff got past the RN destroyer and managed to beach near Haifa: the other two were detained at sea. She was given an interim modernization in 1954, which saw her 'X' turret at the rear of the ship replaced by two Squid anti-submarine mortars. She saw duty during the Suez Crisis in 1956.

Decommissioning and disposal
Chieftain was decommissioned after the Suez Crisis and was scrapped in Sunderland on 20 March 1961.

References

Publications

 

1945 ships
Ships built on the River Clyde
C-class destroyers (1943) of the Royal Navy
World War II destroyers of the United Kingdom
Cold War destroyers of the United Kingdom